The Empire Award for Best Soundtrack was an Empire Award presented annually by the British film magazine Empire to honor the best film soundtrack of the previous year. The Empire Award for Best Soundtrack was first introduced at the 13th Empire Awards ceremony in 2008 with the soundtrack from Control receiving the award and last presented at the 14th Empire Awards ceremony in 2009 with the soundtrack from Mamma Mia! receiving the award. The category was revived in 2016 when the Mad Max: Fury Road soundtrack received the award. The current winner of the award is the soundtrack from Baby Driver. Winners were voted by the readers of Empire magazine.

Winners and nominees
In the list below, winners are listed first in boldface, followed by the other nominees. The number of the ceremony (1st, 2nd, etc.) appears in parentheses after the awards year, linked to the article (if any) on that ceremony.

2000s

2010s

References

External links
 
 

Soundtrack
Film music awards